Michael John Mackey Erritt, CB (15 February 1931, Belfast - 3 October 2002, Lindfield, Sussex) was the Deputy Director of the British Government Statistical Service.

Education 
 St Andrew's College, Dublin
 Prince of Wales School, Nairobi
 Queen's University, Belfast (BSc (Econ)).

Career 
 Research Officer, Science and Industry Committee, 1953
 Assistant Statistician, Central Statistical Office, 1955
 Statistician: Board of Trade, 1960; H.M. Treasury, 1964; Board of Trade, 1967
 Chief Statistician: Inland Revenue, 1968; Central Statistical Office, 1973; Departments of Industry, Trade and Prices and Consumer Protection, 1975; Ministry of Defence, 1979
 Assistant Under-Secretary of State and Director of Statistics, Ministry of Defence, 1981
 Assistant Director, Central Statistical Office, 1985-1991; Deputy Director, Government Statistical Service, 1989-1991.

He moved from the MoD back to the CSO because Michael Heseltine ordered a reduction in the number of statisticians in the MoD and his post was downgraded.

References
 Who was Who

1931 births
2002 deaths
Alumni of Queen's University Belfast
Civil servants in the Central Statistical Office (United Kingdom)
Civil servants in the Board of Trade
Civil servants in HM Treasury
Civil servants in the Board of Inland Revenue
Civil servants in the Ministry of Defence (United Kingdom)
20th-century English mathematicians
Civil servants from Belfast
Companions of the Order of the Bath
People from Lindfield, West Sussex